The 1929 Washington State Cougars football team was an American football team that represented Washington State College during the 1929 college football season. Head coach Babe Hollingbery led the team to a 4–2 mark in the PCC and 10–2 overall.

Schedule

References

Washington State
Washington State Cougars football seasons
Washington State Cougars football